Winter Kills is a black comedy novel by Richard Condon, exploring the assassination of a U.S. president.  It was published in 1974.  The novel parallels the death of John F. Kennedy and the conspiracy theories about it.

Plot summary
The novel begins with U.S. President Timothy Kegan already having been assassinated in Philadelphia at Hunt Plaza. The ensuing presidential commission condemns a lone gunman as the killer. The narrative starts years later, when Kegan's half-brother, Nick, witnesses the death-bed confession of a man claiming to have been part of the killing's 'hit squad'. As the protagonist attempts to uncover those behind it, he encounters numerous groups and persons that could have led or been part of the conspiracy. One is Lola Camonte, a hostess, lobbyist and fixer.  She recounts the story of President Kegan asking her about appointing a member of organized crime to the Court of St. James's. The character "Joe Diamond" is the fictional representation of the killer of Kennedy's assassin, Lee Harvey Oswald, the Mob-connected Dallas nightclub owner Jack Ruby.

Condon's book describes numerous intertwined threads, variously implicating (or proffering as diversions to put the protagonist off the trail) the Jewish/Italian-American Mob, figures related to Cuba, even possible domestic police connections. Only in the final act, in which Nick meets with his vicious and perverse Joseph P. Kennedy-like 'father-figure', is the truth revealed with a twist ending implicating the "system" of interrelated interests embracing Organized crime, the U.S. covert world, Big Business, and political fixers.

Film adaptation

In 1979, a film adaptation of the novel was released, Winter Kills, which starred Jeff Bridges and John Huston.

See also
 Assassinations in fiction

References

1974 American novels
American comedy novels
American political novels
American novels adapted into films
Novels about the assassination of John F. Kennedy
Cultural depictions of John F. Kennedy
Cultural depictions of Lee Harvey Oswald
Novels by Richard Condon
Doubleday (publisher) books